Syreeta is the fourth solo album by Motown recording artist and American singer-songwriter Syreeta Wright (also known as "Syreeta"), released by the Tamla label on April 26, 1980.  It's also the second album to be titled Syreeta after her 1972 debut album.

Reception

The album was released shortly after Wright's duet with Billy Preston, "With You I'm Born Again", gave her the biggest charted success of her career. The album included Wright's take of her famous compositions, "I Blame It On the Sun", which she wrote for ex-husband Stevie Wonder's Talking Book and a funky take on Wonder's "Signed, Sealed, Delivered (I'm Yours)", which she also co-wrote. Wright provided lyrics and composition on one other song – "Dance For Me Children", with Curtis Robertson. Wright also collaborated with Preston on the album with the duets, "Please Stay" and "One More Time for Love", the latter duet charted modestly successful on the pop and R&B charts upon its release. The album features a smiling Wright in her trademark multi-colored braids.

Track listing
"Blame It On The Sun" (Stevie Wonder, Wright) (4:20)
"Let Me Be The One" (Bill Withers, Skip Scarborough) (4:01)
"You Bring Out The Love In Me" (Kenneth Peterson) (3:30)
"Please Stay" (with Billy Preston) (Billy Preston, David Shire) (4:18)
"He's Gone" (George Goldner, Arlene Smith, Richard Barrett) (3:27)
"Love Fire" (Michelle Aller, Bob Esty) (4:51)
"Here's My Love" (Keith Echols, Anthony Miller) (3:27)
"Signed, Sealed, Delivered (I'm Yours)" (Stevie Wonder, Lula Mae Hardaway, Lee Garrett, Wright) (3:27)
"Dance For Me Children" (Wright, Curtis Robertson, Jr., Sheree Brown) (2:52)
"One More Time for Love" (with Billy Preston) (Jerry Peters) (3:51)
"One More Time for Love (reprise)" (0:58)

Personnel
Syretta
Musicians: David T. Walker, Dorothy Ashby, Eddie N. Watkins, Jr., Freddie Washington, Greg Poree, Harvey Mason, Jerry Peters, Joe Blocker, Leon "Ndugu" Chancler, Paul Jackson Jr., Scott Edwards, Tim May, Bob Esty, Dan Wyman, David Campbell, Greg Mathieson, Jay Graydon, Ken Peterson, Lee Ritenour, Lenny Castro, Mike Baird, Ollie E. Brown, Paulinho da Costa, Ray Parker Jr., Richard Tee, Steve Lukather, Trevor Veitch, Dennis Budimir, Gary Coleman, Reggie McBride, Arthur G. Wright, David Shields, James Gadson, Melvin Webb, Sonny Burke
Backing vocals: Jerry Peters, Sheree Brown, Becky Lopez, Sherlie Matthews, Venetta Fields, Alfie Silas, Francine Howard, Voncielle Faggett, Gwen Matthews, Monalisa Young, Oma Drake, Terry Young

Charts

Singles

External links
 Syreeta-Syreeta (1980) at Discogs

References

1980 albums
Syreeta albums
Albums produced by Hal Davis
Albums produced by Richard Perry
Albums produced by Jerry Peters
Tamla Records albums